Vinalopó Mitjà (lit. "Middle Vinalopó") is a comarca in the province of Alicante, Valencian Community, Spain.

Municipalities

The comarca comprises eleven municipalities, listed below with their areas and populations:

Notes

References

 
Comarques of the Valencian Community
Geography of the Province of Alicante